is the eleventh solo album by Susumu Hirasawa.

Track listing

External links
Planet Roll Call
Interactive Live Show 2009 "LIVE Planet Roll Call"

Susumu Hirasawa albums
2009 albums